There are 48 Grade I listed buildings in Greater Manchester, England. In the United Kingdom, the term listed building refers to a building or other structure officially designated as being of special architectural, historical or cultural significance; Grade I structures are those considered to be "buildings of exceptional interest". In England, the authority for listing under the Planning (Listed Buildings and Conservation Areas) Act 1990 rests with Historic England, a non-departmental public body sponsored by the Department for Culture, Media and Sport.

The metropolitan county of Greater Manchester is made up of 10 metropolitan boroughs: Bolton, Bury, Manchester, Oldham, Rochdale, Salford, Stockport, Tameside, Trafford and Wigan. The Grade I buildings in each borough are listed separately. Manchester, the world's first industrialised city, has 15 of Greater Manchester's 48 Grade I listed buildings, the highest number of any borough. Oldham is the only borough to have no listed buildings with a Grade I rating. The River Irwell forms the boundary between Manchester and Salford, so one listed structure, the railway bridge over the Irwell, has been listed under both Manchester and Salford.

Most of Greater Manchester's listed buildings date from the Victorian and Edwardian periods. According to an Association for Industrial Archaeology publication, Greater Manchester is "one of the classic areas of industrial and urban growth in Britain, the result of a combination of forces that came together in the 18th and 19th centuries: a phenomenal rise in population, the appearance of the specialist industrial town, a transport revolution, and weak local lordship". Much of the region, historically a part of Lancashire, was at the forefront of textile manufacturing from the early 19th century until the early 20th century, and the county includes several former mill towns. Greater Manchester has a wealth of industrial heritage, represented by industrial architecture found throughout the county, but most of its Grade I listed buildings have a municipal, ecclesiastic or other cultural heritage.

The oldest Grade I listed structure in Greater Manchester is the Parish Church of St Mary the Virgin in Eccles, completed in the 13th century but greatly expanded since then. There are eight listed manor houses, the earliest of which date from the 14th century; Wardley Hall, still in use today as the residence of the Roman Catholic Bishop of Salford, has the preserved skull of St Ambrose Barlow – one of the Forty Martyrs of England and Wales – on display in a niche at the top of the main staircase. Three buildings are attributed to engineer George Stephenson. One of them, Liverpool Road railway station, is the oldest surviving railway station in the world. The newest Grade I listed building in Greater Manchester is Royd House, built and designed by Edgar Wood in 1916 as his residence.

Bolton

|}

Bury

|}

Manchester

|}

Rochdale

|}

Salford

|}

Stockport

|}

Tameside

|}

Trafford

|}

Wigan

|}

See also 

Architecture of Manchester
Conservation in the United Kingdom
Grade II listed buildings in Manchester
Grade II* listed buildings in Greater Manchester
List of tallest buildings in Manchester
Scheduled Monuments in Greater Manchester

Notes

References

Citations

Sources

External links 
 

 

Greater Manchester
Lists of listed buildings in Greater Manchester